The 2022 Texas House of Representatives elections were held on November 8, 2022, to elect representatives from all 150 House of Representatives districts across the U.S. state of Texas. It was held alongside numerous other federal, state, and local elections, including the 2022 Texas State Senate election. The winners of this election served in the Eighty-eighth Texas Legislature.

Background 
Democrats made major inroads in the Texas House of representatives in 2018, especially in suburban areas; however in 2020, Republicans maintained control of the Texas House of Representatives by an 83–67 margin. Republicans have controlled the chamber since the 2002 election.

This election will be the first election held after the 2020 United States redistricting cycle.

In July 2021, the majority of Democratic representatives broke quorum during a special legislative session in protest of a controversial Republican-backed voting restrictions  bill.

On November 2, 2021, Republican John Lujan won a special election in District 118, flipping it.

On November 15, 2021, Democratic representative Ryan Guillen announced he was changing his party affiliation to Republican. Guillen was the only Democrat in the state house to vote in favor of the Republicans' voting and transgender athlete laws.

This left the partisan balance at 85 Republicans and 65 Democrats going into the 2022 elections. Democrats would have needed to flip 11 seats in order to claim control of the chamber from Republicans.

Redistricting 
Following the 2020 United States census, the Texas Legislature underwent its decennial redistricting. Texas House of Representatives districts follow the "county line rule," effectively granting individual counties delegations of state house seats based on their population. The census found that Texas had a population of 29,145,505 in 2020, giving each district an "ideal population" of 194,303 people. In 2010, the "ideal population for a district" was 167,637 people. Counties with at least this number of people must fully contain at least one state house district. Counties with sufficient population for two or more districts must be divided into that number of districts. Should a county have sufficient population for one or more district plus a fraction of another, one district from another county may extend into it to represent the remaining population. District delegations for counties with at least one district changed as follows following the 2020 Census:

*Cameron County contains parts of both District 35 and District 37, which the Mexican American Legislative Caucus is currently arguing in MALC v. Abbott violates the "county line rule."

As a result of these changes, the following districts drastically moved:

 District 9 moved from the Louisiana/Arkansas border to central East Texas.
 Districts 12 and 13 switched places.
 District 19 moved from East Texas to Central Texas.
 District 57 moved from East Texas to Denton County.
 District 61 moved from Wise and Parker Counties to Collin County.
 District 68 moved from West Texas to North Texas.
 District 76 moved from El Paso County to Fort Bend County.

Seats without incumbents 

 District 13 (Around McLennan County)
 District 20 (Williamson County)
 District 37 (Willacy & Cameron Counties)
 District 57 (Denton County)
 District 65 (Denton County)
 District 70 (Collin County)
 District 73 (Hays & Comal Counties)
 District 76 (Fort Bend County)
 District 85 (West of Harris County)
 District 107 (Dallas County)

Double-bunked incumbents 
*double bunked means when two incumbents are forced into the same district due to redistricting.
 District 7 - Jay Dean (R) and Chris Paddie (R)
 District 9 - James White (R) and Trent Ashby (R)
 District 12 - Kyle Kacal (R) and Ben Leman (R)
 District 19 - Terry Wilson (R) and Kyle Biedermann (R)
 District 26 - Jacey Jetton (R) and Phil Stephenson (R)
 District 38 - Alex Dominguez (D) and Eddie Lucio III (D)
 District 60 - Glenn Rogers (R) and Phil King (R)
 District 63 - Tan Parker (R) and Michelle Beckley (D)
 District 79 - Claudia Ordaz Perez (D) and Art Fierro (D)
 District 108 - Morgan Meyer (R) and John Turner (D)

Retirements 
As of March 2022, 25 incumbents, including 10 Democrats and 15 Republicans, have decided to retire, 10 of which are seeking other office.

 District 9: Chris Paddie (R) is retiring.
 District 13: Ben Leman (R) is retiring.
 District 17: John Cyrier (R) is retiring.
 District 19: James White (R) is retiring to run for Texas Commissioner of Agriculture.
 District 22: Joe Deshotel (D) is retiring.
 District 23: Mayes Middleton (R) is retiring to run for Texas State Senate.
 District 37: Alex Dominguez (D) is retiring to run for Texas State Senate.
 District 38: Eddie Lucio III (D) retired early on January 31, 2022, causing a special election.
 District 50: Celia Israel (D) is retiring.
 District 51: Eddie Rodriguez (D) is retiring to run for US House of Representatives in District 35.
 District 61: Phil King (R) is retiring to run for Texas State Senate.
 District 63: Tan Parker (R) is retiring to run for Texas State Senate.
 District 65: Michelle Beckley (D) is retiring to run for Texas Lieutenant Governor.
 District 70: Scott Sanford (R) is retiring.
 District 73: Kyle Biedermann (R) is retiring.
 District 84: John Frullo (R) is retiring.
 District 92: Jeff Cason (R) is retiring.
 District 93: Matt Krause (R) is retiring to run for Tarrant County District Attorney.
 District 100: Jasmine Crockett (D) is retiring to run for the US House of Representatives in District 30.
 District 114: John Turner (D) is retiring.
 District 122: Lyle Larson (R) is retiring.
 District 124: Ina Minjarez (D) is retiring to run for Bexar County Commissioners Court Judge.
 District 127: Dan Huberty (R) is retiring.
 District 133: Jim Murphy (R) is retiring.
 District 147: Garnet Coleman (D) retired early on February 28, 2022.

Special elections 
District 10: Jake Ellzey (R) was elected for the Texas's 6th congressional district of the United States House of Representatives in a special election. A special election to fill his seat in the Texas House of Representatives was held on August 31, 2021. No candidate received 50% of the vote, so the top-two winners, Brian Harrison and former state Rep. John Wray, advanced to a runoff held on September 28. Harrison won the runoff and was sworn in on October 12, 2021.

District 68: Drew Springer (R) was elected for the District 30 of the Senate in a special election. A special election for the district was held on January 23, 2021. No candidate received 50% of the votes to win the election, so a runoff election was held to determine a winner of the top two candidates of the January election, Craig Carter and David Spiller. Spiller won the election on February 23, and was sworn in on March 9, 2021.

District 118: Leo Pacheco (D) resigned to teach public administration at San Antonio College. A special election for the district was held on September 29, 2021. No candidate received 50% of the votes to win the election, so a runoff election will be held to determine a winner of the top two candidates of the September election, John Lujan and Frank Ramirez. Lujan narrowly won the runoff on November 2, 2021, flipping the district which Democratic presidential candidate Joe Biden had won by 14 percentage points in 2020.

District 38: Eddie Lucio III (D) announced he would not seek re-election in 2022, citing personal reasons. On January 31, 2022, he resigned from his seat early. A special election to fill the seat for the remainder of Lucio's term was held on May 7, 2022. Because the filing deadline passed on December 13, 2021, the winner of the special election, Erin Gamez, would not have been able to run for a full term unless she had already filed for the general election.

Incumbents defeated

In primaries

Democrats
District 79: Art Fierro lost renomination to fellow incumbent Claudia Ordaz Perez in a redistricting race.

Republicans
District 85: Phil Stephenson lost renomination to Stan Kitzman.

Predictions

Summary of results

Close races
Seats where the margin of victory was under 10%:

Detailed results

Political parties in bold indicate the party that currently controls the seat.

District 1 
4th term incumbent Republican Representative Gary VanDeaver has represented the 1st District since 2015. As no other candidate ran in the race, he was declared elected and the election was canceled.

District 2
1st term incumbent Republican Representative Bryan Slaton has represented the 2nd District since 2021. As no other candidate ran in the race, he was declared elected and the election was canceled.

District 3 
5th term incumbent Republican Representative Cecil Bell Jr. has represented the 3rd District since 2013. As no other candidate ran in the race, he was declared elected and the election was canceled.

District 4
2nd term incumbent Republican Representative Keith Bell  has represented the 4th District since 2019. Matt Savino ran as the Libertarian Candidate.

District 5
3rd term incumbent Republican Representative Cole Hefner has represented the 5th District since 2017. As no other candidate ran in the race, he was declared elected and the election was canceled.

District 6
5th term incumbent Republican Representative Matt Schaefer has represented the 6th District since 2013. Cody Grace ran as the Democratic Candidate.

District 7
3rd term incumbent Republican Representative Jay Dean has represented the 7th District since 2017. During redistricting, the 7th District was redrawn to include the old 9th District, which was represented by 5th term incumbent Republican Representative Chris Paddie since 2013. Jay Dean ran for reelection, and Chris Paddie announced that he would not be seeking reelection. As no other candidate ran in the race, Jay Dean was declared elected and the election was canceled.

District 8
2nd term incumbent Republican Representative Cody Harris has represented the 8th District since 2019. R. Edwin Adams ran as the Libertarian Candidate.

District 9
5th term incumbent Republican Representative Trent Ashby has represented the 57th District since 2013. In redistricting, District 57 was renumbered to District 9. Jason Rogers ran as the Democratic Candidate.

District 10
1st term incumbent Republican Representative Jake Ellzey represented the 10th District from January 2021 to July 2021. He resigned in July 2021 to run for U.S. House of Representatives in Texas 6th District special election. Jake Ellzey was succeeded by Brian Harrison, who ran for a full term. As no other candidate ran in the race, he was declared elected and the election was canceled.

District 11
5th term incumbent Republican Representative Travis Clardy has represented Texas House of Representatives 11th District since 2013.

District 12
5th term incumbent Republican Representative Kyle Kacal has represented Texas House of Representatives 12th District since 2013.
2nd term incumbent Republican Representative Ben Leman has represented Texas House of Representatives 13th District since 2019.
New 12th District is redrawn from old 12th District and 13th District.

District 13
This District was created by 2020 redistricting cycle. McLennan County was drawn in to this district.

District 14
6th term incumbent Republican Representative John N. Raney has represented Texas House of Representatives 14th District since 2011. He is running for reelection. Jeff Miller is running as Libertarian Candidate.

District 15
2nd term incumbent Republican Representative Steve Toth has represented Texas House of Representatives 15th District since 2019. He is running for reelection. Kristin Johnson is running as Democratic Candidate.

District 16
4th term incumbent Republican Representative Will Metcalf has represented Texas House of Representatives 16th District since 2015.

District 17
4th term incumbent Republican Representative John Cyrier has represented Texas House of Representatives 17th District since 2015. He announced not seeking for reelection.

Districts 18 
3rd term incumbent Republican Representative Ernest Bailes has represented Texas House of Representatives 18th District since 2017.

Districts 19 
3rd term incumbent Republican Representative Terry Wilson has represented Texas House of Representatives 20th District since 2017. He is running for election in New 20th District. 5th term incumbent Republican Representative Kyle Biedermann has represented Texas House of Representatives 73rd District since 2013. He announced not seeking for reelection. The 19th District was redrawn from old 20th District and 73rd District.

District 20
This District was created by 2020 redistricting cycle. Williamson County 
was drawn in to this district. Terry Wilson is running as Republican Candidate. Raul Camacho is running as Democratic Candidate.

District 21
4th term incumbent Republican Representative Dade Phelan has represented Texas House of Representatives 21st District since 2015. He is running for election.

District 22
12th term incumbent Democratic Representative Joe Deshotel has represented Texas House of Representatives 22nd District since 1999. He announced he was not seeking reelection.

District 23
2nd term incumbent Republican Representative Mayes Middleton has represented Texas House of Representatives 23rd District since 2015. He retired to run for Texas State Senate 11th District election.

District 24
5th term incumbent Republican Representative Greg Bonnen has represented Texas House of Representatives 24th District since 2013. He is running for reelection.

District 25
1st term incumbent Republican Representative Cody Vasut has represented Texas House of Representatives 25th District since 2021. He is running for reelection.

District 26
1st term incumbent Republican Representative Jacey Jetton has represented Texas House of Representatives 26th District since 2021. He is running for election in New 26th District. 5th term incumbent Republican Representative Phil Stephenson has represented Texas House of Representatives 85th District since 2013. He announced not seeking for reelection. The 26th District is redrawn from old 26th District and 85th District.

District 27
6th term incumbent Democratic Representative Jacey Jetton has represented Texas House of Representatives 27th District since 2011. He is running for reelection in the new 26th District.

District 28
2nd term incumbent Republican Representative Gary Gates has represented Texas House of Representatives 28th District since 2020. He is running for reelection.

District 29
5th term incumbent Republican Representative Ed Thompson has represented Texas House of Representatives 29th District since 2013. He is running for reelection.

District 30
12th term incumbent Republican Representative Geanie Morrison has represented Texas House of Representatives 30th District since 1999. She is running for reelection.

District 31
10th term incumbent Republican Representative Ryan Guillen has represented Texas House of Representatives 31st District since 2003. First elected as a Democrat, he announced he would switch to the Republican Party on November 15, 2021. He is running for reelection.

District 32
7th term incumbent Republican Representative Todd Ames Hunter has represented Texas House of Representatives 32nd District since 2009. He is running for reelection.

District 33
3nd term incumbent Republican Representative Justin Holland has represented Texas House of Representatives 33rd District since 2017. He is running for reelection.

District 34
5th term incumbent Democratic Representative Abel Herrero has represented Texas House of Representatives 34th District since 2013. He is running for reelection.

District 35
5th term incumbent Democratic Representative Oscar Longoria has represented Texas House of Representatives 35th District since 2013. He is running for reelection.

District 36
6th term incumbent Democratic Representative Sergio Muñoz has represented Texas House of Representatives 36th District since 2011. He is running for reelection.

District 37
This District was created by 2020 redistricting cycle. Willacy County & Cameron County were drawn in to this district.

District 38
2nd term incumbent Democratic Representative Alex Dominguez has represented Texas House of Representatives 37th District since 2019. He retired to run for Texas State Senate 27th District. 8th term incumbent Democratic Representative Eddie Lucio III has represented Texas House of Representatives 38th District since 2011. He resigned in January 2022. The seat will be filled for the remainder of the term by a special election. The new 38th District was redrawn from old 37th District and 38th District.

District 39
9th term incumbent Democratic Representative Armando Martinez has represented Texas House of Representatives 39th District since 2005. He is running for reelection.

District 40
5th term incumbent Democratic Representative Terry Canales has represented Texas House of Representatives 40th District since 2013. He is running for reelection.

District 41
6th term incumbent Democratic Representative Robert Guerra has represented Texas House of Representatives 41st District since 2012. He is running for reelection.

District 42
11th term incumbent Democratic Representative Richard Pena Raymond has represented Texas House of Representatives 42nd District since 2001. He is running for reelection.

District 43
6th term incumbent Republican Representative J. M. Lozano has represented Texas House of Representatives 43rd District since 2011. He is running for reelection.

District 44
6th term incumbent Republican Representative John Kuempel has represented Texas House of Representatives 44th District since 2011. He is running for reelection.

District 45
2nd term incumbent Democratic Representative Erin Zwiener has represented Texas House of Representatives 45th District since 2019. She is running for reelection.

District 46
2nd term incumbent Democratic Representative Sheryl Cole has represented the Texas House of Representatives' 46th District since 2019. She is running for reelection. This district incorporates parts of East Austin, Pflugerville, and Manor.

District 47
2nd term incumbent Democratic Representative Vikki Goodwin has represented Texas House of Representatives 47th District since 2019. She is running for reelection.

District 48
8th term incumbent Democratic Representative Donna Howard has represented Texas House of Representatives 48th District since 2006. She is running for reelection.

District 49
3rd term incumbent Democratic Representative Gina Hinojosa has represented Texas House of Representatives 49th District since 2017. She is running for reelection.

District 50
5th term incumbent Democratic Representative Celia Israel has represented Texas House of Representatives 49th District since 2014. She announced that not seeking reelection.

District 51
5th term incumbent Democratic Representative Eddie Rodriguez has represented Texas House of Representatives 51st District since 2013. He tired to run for Texas State Senate 35th District.

District 52
3rd term incumbent Democratic Representative James Talarico has represented Texas House of Representatives 52nd District since 2018. He announced that he will run in 50th District.

District 53
4th term incumbent Republican Representative Andrew S. Murr has represented Texas House of Representatives 53rd District since 2015. He is running for reelection.

District 54
2nd term incumbent Republican Representative Brad Buckley has represented Texas House of Representatives 54th District since 2019. He is running for reelection.

District 55
3rd term incumbent Republican Representative Hugh Shine has represented Texas House of Representatives 55th District since 2017. He is running for reelection.

District 56
9th term incumbent Republican Representative Hugh Shine has represented Texas House of Representatives 55th District since 2005. He is running for reelection.

District 57
This District was created by 2020 redistricting cycle. A part of Denton County was drawn in to this district.

District 58
4th term incumbent Republican Representative DeWayne Burns has represented Texas House of Representatives 58th District since 2015. He is running for reelection.

District 59
1st term incumbent Republican Representative Shelby Slawson has represented Texas House of Representatives 59th District since 2021.He is running for reelection.

District 60
1st term incumbent Republican Representative Glenn Rogers has represented Texas House of Representatives 60th District since 2021. 12th term incumbent Republican Representative Phil King has represented Texas House of Representatives 61st District since 1999. The new 60th District was redrawn from old 60th District and 61st District.

District 61 
This District was created by 2020 redistricting cycle. A part of Collin County was drawn in to this district.

District 62 
3nd term incumbent Republican Representative Reggie Smith has represented Texas House of Representatives 62nd District since 2018. He is running for reelection.

District 63 
8th term incumbent Republican Representative Tan Parker has represented Texas House of Representatives 63rd District since 2007. He retired to run for Texas State Senate 12th District.
2nd term incumbent Democratic Representative Michelle Beckley has represented Texas House of Representatives 65th District since 2019. She retired to run for Lieutenant Governor of Texas
The new 63rd District was redrawn from old 63rd District and 65th District.

District 64 
3nd term incumbent Republican Representative Lynn Stucky has represented Texas House of Representatives 64th District since 2017. He is running for reelection.

District 65 
This District was created by 2020 redistricting cycle. A part of Denton County was drawn in to this district.

District 66 
4th term incumbent Republican Representative Matt Shaheen has represented Texas House of Representatives 66th District since 2015. He is running for reelection.

District 67 
5th term incumbent Republican Representative Jeff Leach has represented Texas House of Representatives 67th District since 2013. He is running for reelection.

District 68 
1st term incumbent Republican Representative David Spiller has represented Texas House of Representatives 68th District since 2021. He is running for reelection. By the 2020 redistricting cycle Texas House 68th District move form West Texas to North Texas.

District 69 
5th term incumbent Republican Representative James Frank has represented Texas House of Representatives 69th District since 2013. He is running for reelection.

District 70 
This District was created by 2020 redistricting cycle. A part of Collin County was drawn in to this district.

District 71 
3nd term incumbent Republican Representative Stan Lambert has represented Texas House of Representatives 71st District since 2017. He is running for reelection.

District 72 
8th term incumbent Republican Representative Drew Darby has represented Texas House of Representatives 72nd District since 2007. He is running for reelection.

District 73 
This District was created by 2020 redistricting cycle. Hays County and Comal County were drawn in to this district.

District 74 
1st term incumbent Democratic Representative Eddie Morales has represented Texas House of Representatives 74th District since 2021. He is running for reelection.

District 75 
5th term incumbent Democratic Representative Mary E. Gonzalez has represented Texas House of Representatives 75th District since 2013. He is running for reelection.

District 76 
1st term incumbent Democratic Representative Claudia Ordaz Perez has represented Texas House of Representatives 76th District since 2021. She is running for reelection 79th District. By the 2020 redistricting cycle Texas House 76th District moved from El Paso County to Fort Bend County.

District 77 
1st term incumbent Democratic Representative Evelina Ortega has represented Texas House of Representatives 77th District since 2021. He is running for reelection.
New 77th District is redrawn from old 76th District and 77th District.

District 78 
5th term incumbent Democratic Representative Joe Moody has represented Texas House of Representatives 78th District since 2013. He is running for reelection.

District 79 
1st term incumbent Democratic Representative Claudia Ordaz Perez has represented Texas House of Representatives 77th District since 2021. He is running for election in 79th District.
2nd term incumbent Democratic Representative Art Fierro has represented Texas House of Representatives 79th District since 2019. He lost renomination in the primary elections.

District 80 
9th term incumbent Democratic Representative Tracy King has represented Texas House of Representatives 80th District since 2005. He is running for reelection.

District 81 
4th term incumbent Republican Representative Brooks Landgraf has represented Texas House of Representatives 81st District since 2015. He is running for reelection.

District 82 
27th term incumbent Republican Representative Tom Craddick has represented Texas House of Representatives 82nd District since 1969. He is running for reelection.

District 83 
4th term incumbent Republican Representative Dustin Burrows has represented Texas House of Representatives 83rd District since 2015. He is running for reelection.

District 84 
6th term incumbent Republican Representative John Frullo has represented Texas House of Representatives 84th District since 2010. He announced not seeking for reelection.

District 85 
This District was created by 2020 redistricting cycle. West of Harris County was drawn in to this district.

District 86 
19th term incumbent Republican Representative John T. Smithee has represented Texas House of Representatives 86th District since 1985. He is running for reelection.

District 87 
6th term incumbent Republican Representative Four Price has represented Texas House of Representatives 87th District since 2011. He is running for reelection.

District 88 
5th term incumbent Republican Representative Ken King has represented Texas House of Representatives 88th District since 2013. He is running for reelection.

District 89 
2nd term incumbent Republican Representative Candy Noble has represented Texas House of Representatives 89th District since 2019. He is running for reelection.

District 90 
4th term incumbent Democratic Representative Ramon Romero Jr. has represented Texas House of Representatives 90th District since 2015. He is running for reelection.

District 91 
5th term incumbent Republican Representative Stephanie Klick has represented Texas House of Representatives 91st District since 2013. She is running for reelection.

District 92 
1st term incumbent Republican Representative Jeff Cason has represented Texas House of Representatives 92nd District since 2021.

District 93 
5th term incumbent Republican Representative Matt Krause has represented Texas House of Representatives 93rd District since 2013. He retired to run for Tarrant County District Attorney.

District 94 
4th term incumbent Republican Representative Tony Tinderholt has represented Texas House of Representatives 94th District since 2013.

District 95 
5th term incumbent Democratic Representative Nicole Collier has represented Texas House of Representatives 95th District since 2013.

District 96 
1st term incumbent Republican Representative David Cook has represented Texas House of Representatives 96th District since 2021.

District 97 
5th term incumbent Republican Representative Craig Goldman has represented Texas House of Representatives 97th District since 2013.

District 98 
5th term incumbent Republican Representative Giovanni Capriglione has represented Texas House of Representatives 98th District since 2013. He is running for reelection.

District 99 
5th term incumbent Republican Representative Charlie Geren has represented Texas House of Representatives 99th District since 2013. He is running for reelection.

District 100 
1st term incumbent Democratic Representative Jasmine Crockett has represented Texas House of Representatives 100th District since 2021. He retired to run for Texas State Senate 30th District.

District 101 
5th term incumbent Democratic Representative Chris Turner has represented Texas House of Representatives 101st District since 2013. He is running for reelection.

District 102 
2nd term incumbent Democratic Representative Ana-Maria Ramos has represented Texas House of Representatives 102nd District since 2019. She is running for reelection.

District 103 
9th term incumbent Democratic Representative Rafael Anchia has represented Texas House of Representatives 103rd District since 2005. He is running for reelection.

District 104 
2nd term incumbent Democratic Representative Ana-Maria Ramos has represented Texas House of Representatives 104th District since 2019. She is running for reelection.

District 105 
2nd term incumbent Democratic Representative Terry Meza has represented Texas House of Representatives 105th District since 2019. He is running for reelection.

District 106 
2nd term incumbent Republican Representative Jared Patterson has represented Texas House of Representatives 106th District since 2019. He is running for reelection.

District 107 
3rd term incumbent Democratic Representative Victoria Neave has represented Texas House of Representatives 107th District since 2017. She is running for reelection.

District 108 
4th term incumbent Republican Representative Morgan Meyer has represented Texas House of Representatives 108th District since 2015.
2nd term incumbent Democratic Representative John Turner has represented Texas House of Representatives 114th District since 2019. He announced not seeking for reelection.
New 108th District is redrawn from old 108th District and 114th District.

District 109 
2nd term incumbent Democratic Representative Carl Sherman has represented Texas House of Representatives 109th District since 2019. She is running for reelection.

District 110 
5th term incumbent Democratic Representative Toni Rose has represented Texas House of Representatives 110th District since 2013. She is running for reelection.

District 111 
20th term incumbent Democratic Representative Yvonne Davis has represented Texas House of Representatives 111th District since 1993. She is running for reelection.

District 112 
7th term incumbent Republican Representative Angie Chen Button has represented Texas House of Representatives 112th District since 2009. She is running for reelection.

District 113 
2nd term incumbent Democratic Representative Rhetta Andrews Bowers has represented Texas House of Representatives 113th District since 2019. She is running for reelection.

District 114 
This District was created by 2020 redistricting cycle. Former U.S. Representative John Bryant is running for the open seat.

District 115 
2nd term incumbent Democratic Representative Julie Johnson has represented Texas House of Representatives 115th District since 2019. She is running for reelection.

District 116 
2nd term incumbent Democratic Representative Trey Martinez Fischer has represented Texas House of Representatives 116th District since 2019. He is running for reelection.

District 117 
3rd term incumbent Democratic Representative Philip Cortez has represented Texas House of Representatives 117th District since 2017. She is running for reelection.

District 118 
1st term incumbent Republican Representative John Lujan has represented Texas House of Representatives 118th District since 2021. He is running for reelection.

District 119 
1st term incumbent Democratic Representative Elizabeth Campos has represented Texas House of Representatives 119th District since 2021. He is running for reelection.

District 120 
3rd term incumbent Democratic Representative Barbara Gervin-Hawkins has represented Texas House of Representatives 120th District since 2017. He is running for reelection.

District 121 
2nd term incumbent Republican Representative Steve Allison has represented Texas House of Representatives 121st District since 2019. He is running for reelection.

District 122 
6th term incumbent Republican Representative Lyle Larson has represented Texas House of Representatives 122nd District since 2011. He announced not seeking for reelection.

District 123 
4th term incumbent Democratic Representative Diego Bernal has represented Texas House of Representatives 123rd District since 2015.

District 124 
4th term incumbent Democratic Representative Ina Minjarez has represented Texas House of Representatives 124th District since 2015. He retired to run for Bexar County Commissioners Court Judge.

District 125 
2nd term incumbent Democratic Representative Steve Allison has represented Texas House of Representatives 125th District since 2019. He is running for reelection.

District 126 
2nd term incumbent Republican Representative Sam Harless has represented Texas House of Representatives 126th District since 2019. He is running for reelection.

District 127 
6th term incumbent Republican Representative Dan Huberty has represented Texas House of Representatives 127th District since 2011. He announced  not seeking for reelection.

District 128 
3rd term incumbent Republican Representative Briscoe Cain has represented Texas House of Representatives 128th District since 2017. He is running for reelection.

District 129 
4th term incumbent Republican Representative Dennis Paul has represented Texas House of Representatives 129th District since 2015. He is running for reelection.

District 130 
3rd term incumbent Republican Representative Briscoe Cain has represented Texas House of Representatives 130th District since 2017. He is running for reelection.

District 131 
9th term incumbent Democratic Representative Alma A. Allen has represented Texas House of Representatives 131st District since 2009. He is running for reelection.

District 132 
1st term incumbent Republican Representative Mike Schofield has represented Texas House of Representatives 132nd District since 2021. He is running for reelection.

District 133 
6th term incumbent Republican Representative Jim Murphy has represented Texas House of Representatives 133rd District since 2011. He is running for reelection, but he withdrew before the Republican primary.

District 134 
1st term incumbent Democratic Representative Ann Johnson has represented Texas House of Representatives 134th District since 2021. She is running for reelection.

District 135 
2nd term incumbent Democratic Representative Jon Rosenthal has represented Texas House of Representatives 135th District since 2019. He is running for reelection.

District 136 
2nd term incumbent Democratic Representative John Bucy III has represented Texas House of Representatives 136th District since 2019. He is running for reelection.

District 137 
5th term incumbent Democratic Representative Gene Wu has represented Texas House of Representatives 137th District since 2013. He is running for reelection.

District 138 
1st term incumbent Republican Representative Lacey Hull has represented Texas House of Representatives 138th District since 2021. He is running for reelection.

District 139 
4th term incumbent Democratic Representative Jarvis Johnson has represented Texas House of Representatives 139th District since 2016. He is running for reelection.

District 140 
7th term incumbent Democratic Representative Jarvis Johnson has represented Texas House of Representatives 140th District since 2009. He is running for reelection.

District 141 
25th term incumbent Democratic Representative Senfronia Thompson has represented Texas House of Representatives 141st District since 1973. He is running for reelection.

District 142
19th term incumbent Democratic Representative Harold Dutton Jr. has represented Texas House of Representatives 142nd District since 1985. He is running for reelection.

District 143
9th term incumbent Democratic Representative Ana Hernandez has represented Texas House of Representatives 143rd District since 2005. She is running for reelection.

District 144
3nd term incumbent Democratic Representative Mary Ann Perez has represented Texas House of Representatives 144th District since 2005. She is running for reelection.

District 145
2nd term incumbent Democratic Representative Christina Morales has represented Texas House of Representatives 145th District since 2005. She is running for reelection.

District 146
3rd term incumbent Democratic Representative Shawn Thierry has represented Texas House of Representatives 146th District since 2017. She is running for reelection.

District 147
16th term incumbent Democratic Representative Garnet Coleman has represented Texas House of Representatives 146th District since 2017. He resigned February 2022.

District 148
1st term incumbent Democratic Representative Penny Morales Shaw has represented Texas House of Representatives 148th District since 2021. She is running for reelection.

District 149
9th term incumbent Democratic Representative Hubert Vo has represented Texas House of Representatives 149th District since 2005. He is running for reelection.

District 150
3rd term incumbent Republican Representative Valoree Swanson has represented Texas House of Representatives 150th District since 2017. She is running for reelection.

See also
2022 United States House of Representatives elections in Texas
2022 Texas gubernatorial election
2022 United States state legislative elections
2022 Texas State Senate election
2022 Texas elections

References

House of Representatives
Texas House of Representatives elections
Texas House of Representatives